ipTTY is a SIP soft phone that supports the conversion of Baudot Tones sent via IP to text. In other words, ipTTY facilitates a TTY/TDD conversation over IP without the need for modems or analog lines. ipTTY connects directly via IP to PBX and VoIP systems that support SIP. This type of communication is necessary for individuals with hearing impairments. Additionally, both the ADA (Americans with Disabilities Act) and Section 508 require organizations to support TTY for individuals if readily achievable. ipTTY, provided the PBX/VoIP system supports SIP, makes this requirement readily achievable.

ipTTY also supports RFC 4103 or what some commonly refer to as Text over IP.

References

External links
 Americans with Disabilities Act - Department of Justice
 For more information about Section 508
 For more information about ipTTY

Assistive technology
VoIP hardware